Alquería is a simple station, part of the TransMilenio mass-transit system of Bogotá, Colombia.

Location

The station is located in southern Bogotá, specifically on Autopista Sur with Carrera 49A.

History

This station was opened April 15, 2006 as part of the section between the stations General Santander and Portal del Sur of the NQS line.

Station services

Old trunk services

Main line service

Feeder routes

This station does not have connections to feeder routes.

Inter-city service

This station does not have inter-city service.

See also 
List of TransMilenio stations

TransMilenio